Staroanninskaya is a rural locality (a stanitsa) and the administrative center of Staroanninskoye Rural Settlement, Novoanninsky District, Volgograd Oblast, Russia. The population was 808 as of 2010. There are 16 streets.

Geography 
Staroanninskaya is located on the left bank of the Buzuluk River, 15 km southwest of Novoanninsky (the district's administrative centre) by road. Kozlinovsky is the nearest rural locality.

References 

Rural localities in Novoanninsky District